William Wendt (February 20, 1865, Bentzen, Kingdom of Prussia – December 29, 1946, Laguna Beach) was a German-born American landscape painter. He was called the "Dean of Southern California landscape painters." Associated with the Eucalyptus School, his work is more closely aligned with the Arts and Crafts Movement in California than the French or American Impressionists.

Being the only son of his parents William Wendt and Williamina Ludwig, he underwent an apprenticeship for cabinetmaking in his youth but was left unsatisfied by the experience. He later emigrated by himself to the United States in 1880. From 1894 to 1896, he traveled extensively with his friend, George Gardner Symons. He married the sculptor, Julia Bracken in 1906 and moved to California shortly thereafter.
 
Wendt was a founding member of the California Art Club, along with his wife Julia, and served as its first president for six years.

Wendt built his studio in Laguna Beach, California. A Laguna street, Wendt Terrace, bears his name.

Early life and education 
Wendt's first painting experience was reportedly as a staff painter for a commercial art shop where he was responsible for applying a single pigment to a painting in a production line of many artists.  Working six days per week, he used his one day off to go into the field, surrounded by nature and painting to satisfy his own creative talents.  He was largely self-taught, having only attended two terms of evening classes at the Art Institute of Chicago.

Awards 
Sole winner of an award at the first Chicago and vicinity annual exhibition, Chicago Art Institute, 1897
Bronze Medal, Buffalo Exposition, 1901
Cahn Prize, Art Institute of Chicago, 1904
Fine Arts Building Prize of the Chicago Society of Western Artists, 1913
Kirchberger Prize, Chicago Art Institute, 1913
Silver Medal, San Francisco Exposition, 1915
Black Prize, California Art Club, 1916
Ranger Purchase Prize, National Academy of Design, 1926
Yerkes Prize, 1893
Young Fortnightly Club Prize, 1897

Selected paintings

Galleries and public collections 
William Wendt Gallery of Art
Bowers Museum, Santa Ana, California
Art Institute of Chicago, Illinois
Laguna Art Museum
Irvine Museum, Irvine, California
Pasadena Art Museum, California
Richmond Art Museum, Indiana
William A. Karges Fine Art

References

Sources 
Edan Milton Hughes, Artists in California, 1786–1940, self-published, 1989 

John Alan Walker, Documents on the Life & Art of William Wendt, self-published, 1992.
Ruth Lily Westphal, Plein Air Painters of California: The Southland, self-published, 1996

External links

William Wendt Gallery of Art-Many Wendt paintings shown
ArtNet: More works by Wendt.

Archival collections
Guide to the William Wendt Letters to Guy and Lucia Edwards. Special Collections and Archives, The UC Irvine Libraries, Irvine, California.
 William Wendt Oil Paintings at AllPainter.com

1865 births
1946 deaths
19th-century American painters
19th-century American male artists
American male painters
20th-century American painters
American landscape painters
Painters from California
German emigrants to the United States
20th-century American male artists